Newton Mulgrave is a village and civil parish in the Scarborough 
district of North Yorkshire, England.

The population of the civil parish was estimated at 40 in 2014. According to the 2001 UK census, Newton Mulgrave parish had a population of 37.

References

External links

Villages in North Yorkshire
Civil parishes in North Yorkshire